The eighth edition of the Pan Pacific Swimming Championships, a long course (50 m) event, was held in 1999 at the Sydney International Aquatic Centre in Sydney, Australia, from 22–29 August. Only two swimmers per country could compete in finals, and only four swimmers per country could compete in semi-finals.

Results

Men's events

Legend:

Women's events

Legend:

Awards
Rookie of the Meet:  (100 m breaststroke)
Male Swimmer of the Meet:  (400 m freestyle)
Female Swimmer of the Meet:  (200 m breaststroke)
(determined by FINA points)

References
Results on GBRSports.com

 
Pan Pacific Swimming Championships
Swimming competitions in Australia
Pan Pacific
Sports competitions in Sydney
International aquatics competitions hosted by Australia
1999 in Australian sport